Bikaner District is a district of the state of Rajasthan in western India. The historic city of Bikaner is the district headquarters. The district is located in Bikaner Division along with the three other districts of Churu, Sri Ganganagar and Hanumangarh.

Geography

The district is bounded by Ganganagar district to the north, Hanumangarh district to the northeast, Churu district to the east, Nagaur district to the southeast, Jodhpur district to the south, Jaisalmer district to the southwest, and Punjab Province of Pakistan to the northwest.

Bikaner district lies in the Thar Desert. The Indira Gandhi Canal, also known as the Rajasthan Canal, runs through the district from northeast to southwest, providing irrigation water for the district.

In October, 2020 an international group of researchers found a lost river that ran through the central Thar Desert ; 1,72,000 years ago.

Climate

Administrative set-up

Bikaner district has eight sub-divisions called tehsils: Bikaner, Nokha, Loonkaransar, Khajuwala, Shri Dungargarh, Kolayat, Chhattargarh and Pugal. There are two sub-tehsils: Bajju is in Kolayat and Mahajan is in Loonkaransar.

There are 1498 villages and 290 gram panchayats. There is one municipal corporation (Bikaner) and six municipal councils: Deshnok, Nokha, Dungargarh, Khajuwala, Loonkaransar and Napasar. The collector and district magistrate (DM) of Bikaner is Nimit Mehta and additional magistrate is Sunita Chaudhary.

Demographics

According to the 2011 census Bikaner district has a population of 2,363,937, roughly equal to the nation of Latvia or the US state of New Mexico. This gives it a ranking of 190th in India (out of a total of 640). Its population growth rate over the decade 2001-2011 was 41.42%. Bikaner has a sex ratio of 903 females for every 1,000 males, and a literacy rate of 65.92%. 33.86% of the population lives in urban areas. Scheduled Castes and Scheduled Tribes make up 20.88% and 0.33% of the population respectively.

Languages 

At the time of the 2011 Census of India, 81.09% of the population spoke Rajasthani, 14.94% Marwari, 2.05% Hindi, 1.71% Urdu and 0.98% Sindhi as their first language.

See also
Government Polytechnic College Bikaner
Tahindesar

References

External links

 

 
Districts of Rajasthan
Districts in Bikaner division